The Federal University of Santa Catarina (UFSC) is a public university in Florianópolis, the capital city of Santa Catarina in southern Brazil.

Considered one of the leading universities in Brazil, UFSC is the 6th best university in Latin America in the ranking of Times Higher Education; the 23nd by QS World University Rankings, and was ranked as the 10th best institution of higher education in Latin America by the Webometrics Ranking of World Universities. In the annual ranking of the Brazilian newspaper Folha de São Paulo, it is the 6th best Brazilian university, with courses being among the ten best in the country.

The structure of its campus comprises 11 Academic Schools (Centros de Ensino), divided by field of study. Every School is divided in departments, the largest one being the Department of Mechanical Engineering. The oldest school at UFSC is the School of Law. The Department of Law was the first of UFSC's departments to be officially recognized in 1932.

History 

The history of the Federal University of Santa Catarina has its roots in the Polytechnic Institute of Florianópolis founded on March 13 of 1917 by José Arthur Boiteux. Organized as a free institute, it was the first college degree institution of Santa Catarina state. On February 11, 1932 the Law School was incorporated, officially in 1935.

That triggered a movement to start the first state university and on December 18, of 1960 it became the University of Santa Catarina, offering the courses of Law, Medicine, Pharmacy, Philosophy, Economics, Social Service and the School of Industrial Engineering. On July 15, 1968, as an effort of the Brazilian government to improve college education in Brazil with education reform, the major universities in Brazil were reorganized in Schools and Departments and acquired a new education structure, more resembling the American and English methodology. Since then the university became the Federal University of Santa Catarina.

In 1961 the institution earned a new place in the city to build its structure, located in the region of Trindade near downtown Florianópolis. The area was previously occupied by a model farm called Assis-Brasil and is located near the coast, having several streams crossing the actual campus. The moving was finished in 1980.

A young university, the Federal University of Santa Catarina continues to grow. During the 1980s, it began to invest heavily in the expansion of graduate programs and  research, besides supporting the creation of technology centers in the state of Santa Catarina and the development of a number of outreach projects for the community. Today, UFSC has four other campuses distributed in the cities of Araranguá, Blumenau, Curitibanos and Joinville.

Admissions 

The Universidade Federal de Santa Catarina undergraduate admission process is almost similar to all others in Brazil, using a process called vestibular. It is comprised by several written tests usually performed in 2–3 days. The competition is fierce and the percentage of successful applicants is usually lower than 15% (12,6% in 2018's process). 

The admission process for graduate school is more complex and usually involves a test and a recommendation from the previous college. People interested in graduate degrees at UFSC should contact the department of the intended program directly. The Brazilian Ministry of Education, through CAPES (Coordenação de Aperfeiçoamento de Pessoal do Nível Superior, Superior Level Personnel Enhancement Coordination) evaluates graduate programs in Brazil every three years, ranking them from 1 (worst) to 7, being 6 excellence and 7 international excellence level.

The following graduate programs at UFSC have received grades 6 or 7, as per the last CAPES evaluation (2013):

 Aquaculture 
 Chemical Engineering 
 Chemistry 
 Civil Engineering
 Electrical Engineering 
 Food Engineering 
 Food Science 
 Interdisciplinary Studies in Human Sciences 
 Law 
 Linguistics 
 Mechanical Engineering
Materials Science and Engineering
 Nursing 
 Plant Genetic Resources
 Pharmacology 
 Philosophy 
 Scientific and Technological Education

Numbers 

2016 numbers, provided by the institution.
 119 undergraduate programs;
 82 Master's degree programs;
 55 Doctoral degree programs;
 45,006 students (total);
 2,670 professors;
 3,242 administrative staff.

Academic schools 

School of Agricultural Sciences – CCA
School of Biological Sciences – CCB
School of Communication and Arts – CCE
School of Education – CED
School of Health Sciences – CCS
School of Law – CCJ
School of Philosophy and Human Sciences – CFH
School of Physical and Mathematical Sciences – CFM
School of Sports – CDS
School of Socio-Economic Sciences – CSE
School of Technology – CTC

Notable faculty
Alvaro Toubes Prata, professor of Mechanical Engineering, member of the Brazilian Academy of Sciences
Sergio Colle, professor of Mechanical Engineering, member of the National Academy of Engineering
Helena Amélia Oehler Stemmer civil engineer

Notable alumni
Gean Loureiro, mayor of Florianópolis 
Dário Berger, senator and former mayor of Florianópolis
Angela Amin, former mayor of Florianópolis 
Esperidião Amin, former governor of Santa Catarina 
Luiz Henrique da Silveira, former governor of Santa Catarina 
Manoel Dias, former Brazilian Minister of Labor
Michel Doukeris, CEO of AB InBev
Zeca Pires, filmmaker
Lourenço Sant'Anna, executive producer 
João Nílson Zunino, former president of Avaí FC and pathologist 
Sônia Bridi, journalist and former international correspondent of Rede Globo

Rankings and reputation

See also
Brazil University Rankings
Universities and Higher Education in Brazil

References

External links

  
University website 

Federal universities of Brazil
Educational institutions established in 1962
Universidade Federal de Santa Catarina
Universidade Federal de Santa Catarina
1962 establishments in Brazil